Nicolás Amodio (born 10 March 1983) is a former Uruguayan football midfielder.

History
Amodio started his football career at hometown club Defensor Sporting in Uruguay during 2003, Sporting were playing in Primera División Uruguaya at the time, which is the nation's top league. He appeared for the club only twice, before relocating to Italy.

The first Italian club he played for was Sambenedettese in Serie C, he notched up 30 appearances scoring 1 goal during his only season for the club. He would move next to Napoli along with fellow Uruguayan midfielder, Mariano Bogliacino.

Amodio was a prominent member for the club during the 2005–06 season, he turned out for them 29 times. Napoli gained promotion back to Serie B by the end of the season. In January 2010 Napoli loaned the Uruguayan midfielder to Serie B club Piacenza Calcio until June 2010.

In August 2013 he signs a contract with US Lecce.

External links
Player profile on Napoli's official website

Living people
1983 births
Footballers from Montevideo
Uruguayan footballers
Defensor Sporting players
S.S.C. Napoli players
Piacenza Calcio 1919 players
A.S.D. Portogruaro players
Treviso F.B.C. 1993 players
Mantova 1911 players
A.S. Sambenedettese players
Peñarol players
U.S. Lecce players
Uruguayan Primera División players
Serie A players
Serie B players
Serie C players
Uruguayan expatriate footballers
Uruguayan expatriate sportspeople in Italy
Expatriate footballers in Italy
Association football midfielders